Nupserha tanganjicae is a species of beetle in the family Cerambycidae. It was described by Stephan von Breuning in 1978.

Subspecies
 Nupserha tanganjicae uluguruensis Breuning, 1978
 Nupserha tanganjicae tanganjicae Breuning, 1978

References

tanganjicae
Beetles described in 1978